Khakimov is a surname. Notable people with the surname include:

 Karim Khakimov (1890–1938), Tartar revolutionary and diplomat
 Nikita Khakimov (born 1988), Russian badminton player
 Rafael Khakimov (born 1990), Russian ice hockey player

See also
 Hakimov, surname